was established on 28 November 1561 in the Treaty of Vilnius between the Polish King and Lithuanian Grand Duke Sigismund II Augustus and the last Landmeister in Livonia Gotthard Kettler, contractually negotiated and granted  privilege, which sets the ratio of the Livland Estates Order on the Polish crown and sealed the end of the Teutonic Order and the Livonian Confederation. For the Duchy of Courland and Semigallia the Pacta Subiectionis was additionally signed, which in addition to the privileges governed the relationship of the nobility to the duke, the Polish king and the Reichstag.

The privileges 
Gotthard Kettler was the last national champion of the Livonian Order. He subordinated himself to the remains of the Order and its vassals Poland-Lithuania. After negotiations with King Sigismund Augustus, he granted the Livonian nobility and Courland nobility special rights: 
 Guarantee of the Evangelical-Lutheran faith
 Guarantee of the official German language
 Guarantee of self-government ("German authorities", "German law")
 Codification of (Livonian) land law
 Assurances of the indigenous people (offices in Livonia and Courland only to locals).

The autonomy rights set in this form served the German upper class also with later changes of rule as basis for negotiations and retained essentially up to the year 1919 (Imperial Russian Baltic governorate Livland) their validity.

References

Literature 
 Burchard von Klot:  Jost Clodt and the privilege Sigismundi Augusti.  Harro Hirschheydt, Hanover 1977,  ( Contributions to the Baltic History , Vol. 6).

External links 

 The "Privilegium Sigismundi Augusti" and the "Pacta Subiectionis" or: the November 1561 in the Baltic history 
 History of the bishoprics in the Teutonic Order

Teutonic Order
1561 treaties
Duchy of Courland and Semigallia
Grand Duchy of Lithuania